Cut Bank Municipal Airport  is three miles southwest of Cut Bank, in Glacier County, Montana, United States. It is owned by Cut Bank and Glacier County.

The airport's website calls it Cut Bank International Airport. Its first flight was on 1 June 1941.

Facilities
It has two asphalt runways: 5/23 is 5,299 by 75 feet (1,615 x 23 m) and 13/31 is 5,300 by 75 feet (1,615 x 23 m).

In the year ending August 22, 2008 the airport had 5,800 aircraft operations, average 15 per day: 90% general aviation, 9% air taxi and 2% military. 32 aircraft were then based at the airport:
88% single-engine, 3% multi-engine and 9% ultralight.

History

During World War II Cut Bank Army Air Field was used by the Second Air Force as an auxiliary heavy bomber training airfield, being controlled by Great Falls Army Air Base.    Several squadrons of groups training at Great Falls in B-17 Flying Fortresses trained at Cut Bank.   Known squadrons were:

 2nd Bombardment Group, 429th Bomb Squadron, November 1942-March 1943
 385th Bombardment Group, 550th Bomb Squadron, March–June 1943
 390th Bombardment Group, 569th Bomb Squadron, June–July 1943
 401st Bombardment Group, 613th Bomb Squadron, July–October 1943

During the Cold War  Cut Bank AFB was an interceptor base, part of Air Defense Command.

The Cut Bank Municipal Airport and Army Air Force Base, on Valier Highway in Cut Bank, Montana was built in 1942. It was listed on the National Register of Historic Places in 2008.

It was built by the Army Corps of Engineers and includes World War II temporary buildings.  It has also been known as Cut Bank International Airport.

See also

 Montana World War II Army Airfields
 List of military installations in Montana

References

External links

1943 establishments in Montana
Airports established in 1943
Airports in Montana
Airfields of the United States Army Air Forces in Montana
Historic American Engineering Record in Montana
National Register of Historic Places in Glacier County, Montana
Transportation in Glacier County, Montana
Airports on the National Register of Historic Places
World War II on the National Register of Historic Places
Historic districts on the National Register of Historic Places in Montana